A hobby farm (also called a lifestyle block in New Zealand, or acreage living or rural residential in Australia) is a smallholding or small farm that is maintained without expectation of being a primary source of income. Some are held merely to provide recreational land for horses or other use. Others are managed as working farms for secondary income, or are even run at an ongoing loss as a lifestyle choice by people with the means to do so, functioning more like a country home than a business.

By country

Australia 
Rural residential living in Australia consists of very large home sites usually on the outskirts of an urban area. Often subdivisions of former farms, these blocks of land are primarily used for residential purposes by those people who enjoy the countryside or have hobbies and interests (e.g. gardening, horses, collecting and restoring old vehicles) which require more land than a normal suburban block or simply prefer the privacy of very-low-density living. Farming may occur on the blocks but is usually conducted on a small scale, more as a hobby than for serious commercial gain. Occupiers of rural residential properties generally accept that there will be a lower level of amenities available to them locally (e.g. shopping centres, public transport) and are prepared to travel further to access such amenities.

United Kingdom
In the UK, country living is becoming a pastime rather than an occupation. The number of farms in England with "no economic output" in recent surveys jumped in one year from 90,000 to 115,000, while the number of large farms fell to only 15,000.

The Royal Institution of Chartered Surveyors says that nearly half of all farms sold in a recent year were bought by non-farmers. This was said to be "consistent with the new trend of buying houses in the country with 20-60 acres of land -- more than a garden, not quite a fully-fledged farm."

A house with a large garden can be a mini-hobby farm, with vegetables, poultry, rabbits and a few hives of bees. An acre of land will support a couple of milking goats or some pigs, and once the hobby farmer is operating on a hectare (about 2.5 acres) he/she can think of poultry free-ranging in an orchard or a mini-flock of sheep.

Doubling the area makes it possible to keep a cow and calf, and increasing it again to  finds space for some cropping in support of the livestock (hay and forage crops) and a worthwhile mixed orchard with apples, plums and other fruit.

Even though each type of pleasure farm may be clearly seen by its owner as a non-profit enterprise, lifestyle farmers claim great satisfaction in making the land productive enough to cover the cost of feeding the livestock and giving some high-quality additions to the household menu, from fruit and vegetables to meat and eggs.

Willy Newlands, author of Hobby Farm (Souvenir Press, London, 2006), says: “Hobby agriculture covers a wide spectrum, from backyard eggs-and-jam to large areas of grazing land. The main planks on which a definition can be made are money and labour: the hobby farmer’s income is largely made from off-farm work and the holding does not employ full-time labour.

“There is a blurred line between the smallholder/crofter and the hobby farmer, although my own definition would be ‘a smallholder tries to make money on his land, a hobby farmer spends money on his land.’ Mainly, it’s a matter of attitude. The nouveau farmer is, above all, enjoying himself.”

United States

In the U.S., a high proportion of farms might be classed as hobby farms. Over 50% of primary farm operators reported that their main income was a job outside of their farm; although, this figure includes some farm operators who do not personally participate in farming and some quite large and productive farms.

In the US, as farms grow in size, older farms become less economically viable. Some are purchased and most of the land is combined with larger nearby farms, however, the large farm has little use for the buildings. These can be sold off with only a building lot of real estate, but are much more saleable if a modest area, 5 to 15 acres (20,000 to 60,000 m²) is sold along with them. These are usually snapped up quickly by people with well-paying city jobs who wish to live in the country, or retirees, who wish to be active as part-time farmers.

Some, especially in developed areas, are used as truck gardens, with their own produce stands, or a regular stall in a local farmer's market.

See also

 Allotment gardens
 Asset-Based Community Development
 Community Food Security Coalition
 Community gardens
 Gentleman farmer
 Special Rural Properties, Western Australia
 Sustainable agriculture

References

Further reading
 
 

Types of farms
Urban agriculture